Carthorpe is a small village and civil parish in the Hambleton district of North Yorkshire, England.

Village services include a pub (the Fox and Hounds Inn), a post office and a Community Hall.

References

External links
 The Fox and Hounds Inn

Villages in North Yorkshire
Civil parishes in North Yorkshire